Next Exit is a 2022 American science fiction comedy-drama film written and directed by Mali Elfman in her directorial debut. It stars Katie Parker, Rahul Kohli, Rose McIver, Karen Gillan, Tongayi Chirisa, and Diva Zappa. It premiered at the Tribeca Festival on June 10, 2022, is scheduled to be released in the United States in November 2022, by Magnet Releasing.

Premise
A scientific study known as Life Beyond, launched by Dr. Stevenson in San Francisco, allows people to commit painless suicide with the knowledge that an afterlife does exist. In New York City, two ready-to-die strangers, Rose and Teddy, randomly end up sharing a rental car for a cross-country trip to their respective Life Beyond appointments.

Cast
 Katie Parker as Rose
 Rahul Kohli as Teddy
 Rose McIver as Heather
 Tongayi Chirisa as Father Jack
 Tim Griffin as John
 Diva Zappa as Karma
 Nico Evers-Swindell as Nick
 Karen Gillan as Dr. Stevenson

Production
Next Exit is the directorial debut of Mali Elfman, who wrote it more than ten years before its premiere. She would revisit and add on to the script every time she was in a "difficult place" or facing a struggle in her life. She wrote the lead role with her friend Katie Parker in mind, and cast Rahul Kohli as the second lead because she liked his performances in the television series iZombie (2015–2019) and the Netflix series The Haunting of Bly Manor (2020). Elfman's friends Rose McIver and Tongayi Chirisa, both of whom also star in iZombie, as well as Karen Gillan and Diva Zappa star as well. Next Exit was in development for over eight years before Helmstreet Productions decided to finance it. It was shot during the COVID-19 pandemic in the states of Missouri, Oklahoma, Texas, New Mexico, and Arizona, sometime between January and February 2021.

Release
The film premiered at the Tribeca Festival on June 10, 2022. In July 2022, Magnolia Pictures bought the distribution rights to the film, and scheduled it for release in November 4, 2022 under its genre arm, Magnet Releasing. In August 2022, Blue Finch Films acquired the film's international rights.

Reception
 

At the Tribeca Festival, the film received the award for Best Cinematography.

References

External links
 

2022 films
2022 directorial debut films
2020s road comedy-drama films
American road comedy-drama films
American science fiction comedy-drama films
Films set in New York City
Films set in San Francisco
Films shot in Arizona
Films shot in Missouri
Films shot in New Mexico
Films shot in Oklahoma
Films shot in Texas
2020s English-language films
2020s American films